Sarıtaş can refer to:

 Sarıtaş, Baskil
 Sarıtaş, Köprüköy